Kuznecheyevskaya is a rural locality (a village) in Bogorodskoye Rural Settlement, Ust-Kubinsky District, Vologda Oblast, Russia. The population was 14 as of 2002.

Geography 
Kuznecheyevskaya is located 70 km northwest of Ustye (the district's administrative centre) by road. Petryayevskaya is the nearest rural locality.

References 

Rural localities in Tarnogsky District